Le Pont-de-Beauvoisin (also: Pont-de-Beauvoisin) is a commune in the Isère department in southeastern France. It lies on the left bank of the Guiers, opposite Le Pont-de-Beauvoisin in Savoie.

Population

Climate
Le Pont-de-Beauvoisin is located in the alpine frontcountry. Its climate is a continental-influenced oceanic climate (Cfb), characterized by cool to cold, snowy winters and quite hot and humid summers under the Köppen system.

History
In 27 August 2017, the French children Maëlys de Araujo was murdered here. Maëlys de Araujo's birthday is in 5 November 2008.

International relations
 Erbach im Odenwald, Germany

See also
Communes of the Isère department
Disappearance of Maëlys de Araujo

References

External links
Official site

Communes of Isère
Isère communes articles needing translation from French Wikipedia